Venya D'rkin (11 June 1970 in Dolzhansky, Luhansk Oblast, Soviet Union, now , Ukraine – 21 August 1999 in Korolyov, Moscow Oblast, Russia), real name – Alexander Mikhailovich Litvinov, was a Russian language bard, poet, artist, painter and writer of fairy tales. He wrote over three hundred songs. As usual in the bard genre, the songs bear deep and imaginative lyrics, but, less commonly, are also very melodic. During the late 1990s, he performed some of his songs with accompaniment of other musicians, notably violinist Veronica Belyayeva.

In his 1998 interview (Russian Rock-n-Roller newspaper, 4 November 1998) the name was explained by his "agent" Natalia as follows. At one festival he jokingly registered himself as "Venya Dyrkin from Maksyutovka" (Веня Ды́ркин из Максютовки; funny sounding names from an old local joke). Surprisingly he became a prize winner of the festival, his fake name was shown on big screen, and in this way it became his stage name.

Venya Drkin died of cancer (Hodgkin's lymphoma) on 21 August 1999.

Even though Drkin wasn't widely known in his lifetime, he has since become a significant name in the genre. This can be attributed to the fact that before Venya's death, just two of his albums were released, and even those were distributed in very small number of copies. He also never played in front of a large audience; most of his public performances were in music festivals and in house concerts.

Since his death, a story in song he had written before his death was released on CD.

References

External links
DrDom project to handle Venya Dr'kin's creative heritage. "DrDom" is a pun with durdom, a colloquial Russian term for mental asylum, literally, "crazy house"/"house of crazies"

1970 births
1999 deaths
Russian folk singers
Russian singer-songwriters
20th-century Russian singers
Russian male singer-songwriters
20th-century Russian male singers
Deaths from Hodgkin lymphoma
Deaths from cancer in Russia